Vigneron was a family of French bow makers. Notable members include Joseph Arthur Vigneron and Andre Vigneron.

References

 
 
 
 Dictionnaire Universel del Luthiers - Rene Vannes 1951, 1972, 1985 (vol.3)
 Universal Dictionary of Violin & Bow Makers - William Henley 1970

Bow makers
French families
Luthiers from Mirecourt